V-Mart Retail Limited is chain Retail small size hypermarket .  In 2002 Lalit Agarwal founded this company. Previously it was incorporated as Varin Commercial Private Limited in West Bengal, India.

References 

Supermarkets of India
Indian companies established in 2002
Retail companies established in 2002
Companies based in West Bengal